Rolling Hills is a home rule-class city in Jefferson County, Kentucky. The population was 959 at the time of the 2010 census.

Geography
Rolling Hills is located in northeastern Jefferson County at  (38.282670, -85.577770). It is bordered to the north by Langdon Place, to the east by Meadow Vale, to the west by Westwood, and otherwise by consolidated Louisville/Jefferson County.

Demographics

At the 2000 census there were 907 people in 385 households, including 259 families, in the city. The racial makeup of the city was 90.74% White, 6.50% African American, 0.33% Native American, 1.54% Asian, 0.22% from other races, and 0.66% from two or more races. Hispanic or Latino of any race were 0.33%.

Of the 385 households 29.9% had children under the age of 18 living with them, 53.0% were married couples living together, 11.4% had a female householder with no husband present, and 32.5% were non-families. 28.3% of households were one person and 9.1% were one person aged 65 or older. The average household size was 2.36 and the average family size was 2.90.

The age distribution was 22.2% under the age of 18, 6.8% from 18 to 24, 32.9% from 25 to 44, 25.1% from 45 to 64, and 13.0% 65 or older. The median age was 39 years. For every 100 females, there were 87.8 males. For every 100 females age 18 and over, there were 84.8 males.

The median household income was $51,071 and the median family income was $57,375. Males had a median income of $40,395 versus $28,375 for females. The per capita income for the city was $25,037. About 2.8% of families and 3.3% of the population were below the poverty line, including 7.0% of those under age 18 and 5.6% of those age 65 or over.

References

External links
City of Rolling Hills official website

Cities in Jefferson County, Kentucky
Cities in Kentucky
Louisville metropolitan area